Line 9 of the Hangzhou Metro is a metro line in Hangzhou. The line is colored brown on system maps.

Opening timeline

Stations
Legend
 - Operational
 - Under construction

See also
  Hangzhou Metro

References

09
Standard gauge railways in China
Railway lines opened in 2021
2021 establishments in China